Halopteris is a genus of cnidarians belonging to the family Halopterididae.

The genus has cosmopolitan distribution.

Species:
 Halopteris alternata (Nutting, 1900) 
 Halopteris australis Galea, 2018

References

Halopterididae
Hydrozoan genera